Njau Forest Park is a forest park in the Gambia. It covers 364 hectares.

References

Forest parks of the Gambia